BL (or similar) may refer to:

Arts and entertainment

 BL Publishing, a division of the wargames manufacturing company, Games Workshop
 Boston Legal, a US legal comedy drama
 Boys' love, Japanese term for female-oriented fiction featuring idealized romantic relationships between two males

Businesses and organizations
 Bell Labs, an audio-technology research and design enterprise
 Boys' Latin School of Maryland, a US private school
 Brisbane Lions, an Australian rules football team in the Australian Football League
 British Library, the UK's national library
 British Leyland, a former UK vehicle manufacturing company
 Pacific Airlines (IATA code BL), a low-cost airline
 Lytvyn Bloc, a Ukrainian political party

Food and drink
 Bitter lemon, a carbonated soft drink
 Bud Light, an American lager beer

In law
 Bachelor of Laws (B.L.), an undergraduate degree in law
 Barrister-at-Law, a degree and professional qualification in Ireland, Northern Ireland and Nigeria.

Places
 BL postcode area, UK, covering Bolton and Bury in Greater Manchester
 Bakerloo line, a London Underground line
 Banja Luka, a city in Bosnia and Herzegovina
 Saint Barthélemy [ISO country code BL], a Caribbean overseas collectivity of France
 Basel-Landschaft (Basel-Country), a canton of Switzerland
 Province of Belluno, Italy (car-license plate abbreviation BL)
 Bolivia (FIPS Pub 10-4 and obsolete NATO digram BL), a central South-American country

Science and technology

Mathematics and computing 
 BL (logic), the logic of continuous t-norms
 BL register, the low byte of an X86 16-bit BX register
 Bootloader

Health and medicine
Accupressure or acupuncture points, e.g., BL-34 or BL-54
Burkitt's lymphoma, a disease
Borderline lepromatous leprosy, a disease

Other uses in science and technology 
 B − L (B minus L), in physics
 Backhoe loader, an engineering vehicle
 Black light, a lamp which operates near the ultraviolet range of light
 Carl Ludwig Blume, botanist, abbreviated Bl.
 Breech-loading weapon, designated BL in British artillery
 One of the Thiele/Small electromechanical parameters of loudspeakers

Other uses
 Ы, Yery or Yeru, a letter in the Cyrillic script
 BL, braille shorthand for blind
 Bakerloo line, a London Underground line
 Bill of lading, a receipt issued by a shipping carrier
 Blessed, an honorific prefix given to beatified Catholics
 Blue Line (Washington Metro)
 Body language, a form of non-verbal communication
 Bhutia-Lepcha, an ethnic grouping of people for which there are reserved seats in the Sikkim Legislative assembly, in India